Fontainemore (Issime ;  from 1939 to 1946) is a town and comune in the Aosta Valley region of north-western Italy.

Toponym 
The toponym "Fontainemore" may derive from an old fountain called in French as « Fontaine de Saint-Maur » or « Fontaine de la mort ».

Géographie 

It is the most Eastern municipality of the Aosta Valley.

References

Cities and towns in Aosta Valley